The  is a music competition for young composers organized in Tokyo, Japan.

History
The Toru Takemitsu Composition Award (annual competition of orchestral composition), which is an international composition award following Toru Takemitsu's principle "Prayer, Hope, Peace", continues since 1997 to encourage younger generations of composers who will shape the coming age by creating new musical works.

The nucleus of this award is in its uniqueness that each year only one judge is responsible for its outcome. For the first 3-year cycle, Takemitsu himself chose the following three composers to head the competition: Henri Dutilleux (1997), György Ligeti (1998), and Luciano Berio (1999). Then, after Takemitsu's death, the three successors, Louis Andriessen (2000 recommended by Berio), Oliver Knussen (2001 recommended by Dutilleux) and Joji Yuasa (2002 recommended by Ligeti) were nominated by the initial judges.

For the third 3-year cycle (2003–2005), George Benjamin (2003), Magnus Lindberg (2004) and John Adams (2005 • cancelled) were nominated by recommendation from the Advisors (Hiroyuki Iwaki, Oliver Knussen, Kent Nagano, Kazushi Ohno, Simon Rattle, Esa-Pekka Salonen and Hiroshi Wakasugi) and preceding judges.

For the fourth 3-year cycle (2007–2009), the selection by the Advisors Committee members and the previous judges were Akira Nishimura (2007), Steve Reich (2008) and Helmut Lachenmann (2009).

Tristan Murail (2010), Salvatore Sciarrino (2011) and Toshio Hosokawa (2012) have been appointed as judges for the new 3-year cycle.

The nominated pieces are performed at the Tokyo Opera City Concert Hall.

Fifty different composers have been nominated for this prize since its inception in 1997 (updated as of 2011 prize).

The total sum of the cash award is 3,000,000 Yen each year.

Results
The winners are:

References

External links
 Official website

Music competitions in Japan
Music in Tokyo